is a city located in Kagoshima Prefecture, Japan. As of October 31, 2021, the city has an estimated population of 30,231, with 15,366 households and a population density of 104 persons per km2. The total area is 290.28 km2.

The modern city of Shibushi was established on January 1, 2006, from the merger of the former town of Shibushi, absorbing the towns of Ariake and Matsuyama (all from Soo District).

The city is served by the Nichinan Line of the JR Kyūshū railway system, which links it to the city of Miyazaki, the capital of the neighbouring prefecture of the same name.

Geography

Climate
Shibushi has a humid subtropical climate (Köppen climate classification Cfa) with hot summers and mild winters. Precipitation is significant throughout the year, and is heavier in summer, especially the months of June and July.

Demographics
Per Japanese census data, the population of Shibushi in 2020 is 29,329 people. Shibushi's population has been in slow decline since the census began in 1950, although it rebounded in the 1955 and 1975 censuses. As of 2020, the town's population is only 60% of what it was in the 1950s.

Notable people
Chiyomaru Kazuki, sumo wrestler
Chiyoōtori Yūki, sumo wrestler

Notable place
 Shibushi Castle (Historic Site)

References

External links

 Shibushi City official website 

Cities in Kagoshima Prefecture
Port settlements in Japan
Populated coastal places in Japan